Emma Brignell Ostler (née Roberts, 1848 – 14 April 1922) was a New Zealand teacher, prohibitionist, landowner and businesswoman.

Early life
She was born in West Ham, Essex, England in about 1848. Emma Roberts (maiden name) was the daughter of Mary Griffith and her husband, Thomas Roberts, a clergyman. In 1852 her parents emigrated to Melbourne, Australia, with their 11 children.

On 14 July 1868 at Melbourne, Emma married William Henry Ostler, a runholder at Benmore sheep station in North Otago, New Zealand, where the couple settled. The couple had four children: Helen Mary (b1869) Edith Louisa (Daisy) (b1874), Henry Hubert (b1876). A fourth child was born in Melbourne but died when only a few months old. The family settled at Ben Ohau for a time but subsequently lived in Timaru for a period from 1876. Emily's father died at the station in 1879 and the property was auctioned leaving Emma penniless.

Footnotes 

 The Women's Suffrage Petition, 1893. New Zealand, Bridget Williams Books, 2017.
Dreaver, Anthony. An Eye for Country: The Life and Work of Leslie Adkin. New Zealand, Victoria University Press, 1997.

References

External links 
Otaki Historical Society Journal Vol 16 1993

Macgregor, M. Petticoat pioneers. Book 2. Wellington, 1975

Stout, R. 'A notable pioneer. The late Mrs. E. B. Ostler'. New Zealand Herald. 18 April 1922

1848 births
1922 deaths
New Zealand schoolteachers
New Zealand temperance activists
New Zealand women in business
People from West Ham
English emigrants to New Zealand
People from Essex (before 1965)